Hunters Are for Killing is a 1970 American TV movie starring Burt Reynolds, Melvyn Douglas and Suzanne Pleshette. The film was originally titled The Return.

Plot
A man comes home from prison to claim his share of his deceased mother's estate.

Production
Reynolds at the time played many Native American roles. There was a Native American aspect to the script for this film but he asked for it to be removed. "There was already so much going for them in the script they didn't need an Indian angle too", he said. Following this film, Reynolds would star in another television movie, Run, Simon, Run (1970), of which the lead character in that film, played by Reynolds, was a Native American.

It was filmed around the Wine Country in Santa Rosa, California in January 1970.

References

External links

1970 television films
1970 films
Films shot in California
Films directed by Bernard Girard